The Patrone 88 (cartridge 88) or M/88 is a rimless bottlenecked rifle cartridge. It was a first-generation smokeless propellant cartridge designed by the German Gewehr-Prüfungskommission (G.P.K.) (Rifle Testing Commission) as the then new smokeless propellant introduced as Poudre B in the 1886 pattern 8×50mmR Lebel started a military rifle ammunition revolution.

The bullet core consisted of 95% lead and 5% antimony. It served as parent cartridge of several 8×57mm rimless and rimmed rifle cartridges.

Origin and military use 

The Patrone 88 was adopted by the German Empire in 1888 as service cartridge along with the Gewehr 1888 service rifle. Reportedly the initial version of the design was of two-piece construction like the 11×60mm Mauser and rimmed (so-called M88A, later developed into M88/8R or 8X57 IR hunting cartridge), but then a modern, "cannelured" type of cartridge case was introduced, which, despite being patented at least as early as 1867 (by Joseph Whitworth), wasn't used by any military before.

In 1894/1895 the bore dimensions were changed in an attempt to improve accuracy and barrel life. The  diameter of the bullets the Patrone 88 was loaded with remained however unchanged and accuracy did not improve. As of 1915 the Patrone 88 bullets became tombac plated.

In German military service the Patrone 88 was replaced in 1904 and 1905 by the S Patrone a.k.a. 7.92×57mm Mauser. The S Patrone and its new spitzer bullet provided the accuracy and barrel life improvements the German military was looking for. As the bolt thrust of the 7.92×57mm Mauser is relatively low compared to many other service rounds used in the early 20th century, many arms originally chambered for the Patrone 88 could be and were adapted for chambering the S Patrone by reaming out metal from the chamber as it required a wider chamber throat to take the differently shaped and thicker brass of the new S Patrone.

Civilian use and offspring
Civilian rifles were also chambered for the Patrone 88. After the adoption of the 7.92×57mm Mauser by the German military, the Patrone 88 was not abandoned by civilian users like hunters. German civilian gunsmiths kept trying to improve the chambering. They took a somewhat similar engineering approach as the German military used, but instead of deepening the grooves and widening the bullet, they reduced the diameter of the lands and grooves whilst leaving the Patrone 88 cartridge itself unchanged. These efforts solved the problems the German military had experienced with the Patrone 88 and resulted and were finalized in what is now known as the 8×57mm I chambering, I (or often, albeit incorrectly, J, which is due to visual similarity of Fraktur I to Roman J) standing for German  'infantry'.

In 1939 the Normalisierungsverordnung (normalization regulation) effectively prohibited the production of non-S-bore/7.92×57mm Mauser chambered arms in Nazi Germany. In post World War II Germany the production of the various preceding chamberings is allowed again, but these chamberings have become rare in post 1939 produced arms.

Civilian 8×57mm I cartridge drawings and dimensions 
The  cartridge has a cartridge case capacity of 4.03 ml (62 grains) H2O.

8×57mm I maximum C.I.P. cartridge dimensions. All sizes in millimeters.

Americans would define the shoulder angle at alpha/2 ≈ 19.1 degrees. The common rifling twist rate for this cartridge is 240 mm (1 in 9.45 in), 4 grooves, Ø of the lands = , Ø grooves = , land width =  and the primer type is large rifle.

According to the official C.I.P. (Commission Internationale Permanente pour l'Epreuve des Armes à Feu Portatives) rulings the 8×57mm I can handle up to  Pmax piezo pressure. In C.I.P. regulated countries every rifle cartridge combo has to be proofed at 125% of this maximum C.I.P. pressure to certify for sale to consumers.
This means that 8×57mm I chambered arms in C.I.P. regulated countries are currently (2017) proof tested at  PE piezo pressure.

The rimless 8×57mm I cartridge has been used as parent case for a rimmed 8×57mm IR variant.

References 

Pistol and rifle cartridges
Military cartridges
Weapons and ammunition introduced in 1888